Aisling Molloy (born 12 June 1964) is a retired Irish middle-distance runner who competed primarily in the 800 meters. She represented her country at one indoor and two outdoor World Championships.

She studied at the Brigham Young University.

Her personal bests in the event are 2:01.14 outdoors (Split 1990) and 2:02.87 indoors (Glasgow 1990).

Competition record

References

All-Athletics profile

1964 births
Living people
Irish female middle-distance runners
World Athletics Championships athletes for Ireland
BYU Cougars women's track and field athletes
BYU Cougars women's cross country runners